Morris Leslie Robinson (born May 29, 1957) is a Canadian former professional ice hockey defenceman who played in one National Hockey League game for the Montreal Canadiens during the 1979–80 NHL season. Although his Hall of Fame brother Larry Robinson was with the Canadiens at that time, they did not play together as the older Robinson was out injured during Moe's brief recall from the AHL made to replace Larry on the roster. Moe Robinson's one NHL game came in Winnipeg on December 15, 1979, as he skated a half dozen shifts in a 6-2 road loss in the Canadiens' first meeting with the Winnipeg Jets which had recently come from the disbanded WHA. The only time that the Robinson brothers were paired together on the blueline in Habs' uniforms was in a 1979 exhibition game against the Philadelphia Flyers.

See also
List of players who played only one game in the NHL

References

External links

1957 births
Canadian ice hockey defencemen
Ice hockey people from Ontario
Kingston Canadians players
Living people
Montreal Canadiens draft picks
Montreal Canadiens players
New England Whalers draft picks
Nova Scotia Voyageurs players
Oklahoma City Stars players
People from the United Counties of Stormont, Dundas and Glengarry